Michael Tay Cheow Ann (born 1959) is a Singaporean diplomat who served as the Ambassador Extraordinary and Plenipotentiary of the Republic of Singapore to the Russian Federation.

Education
Tay graduated from the National University of Singapore with a Master of Philosophy degree.

Career
Upon graduation, he taught at the National University of Singapore for two years before joining the Ministry of Foreign Affairs (MFA). He was in charge of the Middle East, Latin America and Africa region.

Tay founded Foundation for The Arts and Social Enterprise, non-profit organisation and SingJazz, an annual music festival focusing on local and regional musicians and also a showcase for renowned international acts, in 2013

See also 
 Embassy of Singapore in Moscow

References 

Singaporean diplomats
Singaporean people of Chinese descent
Victoria School, Singapore alumni
Living people
Ambassadors of Singapore to Russia
Ambassadors of Singapore to Ukraine
1959 births